is a Japanese television drama that aired on NHK in 2011 in the Asadora time slot. Originally it was planned to air from March 28, 2011 (same as 2005's Asadora series Fight) to September 24, 2011, but it was delayed due to the earthquake and tsunami that hit Japan. It later aired from April 4, 2011 to October 1, 2011, same as 1988's  and 1994's .

Cast
Mao Inoue as Yōko Maruyama (her maiden name was Sudō)
Yūki Yagi as young Yōko
Ayako Wakao as older Yōko Maruyama
Kengo Kora as Kazunari Maruyama
Hikari Mitsushima as Ikuko Tsutsui
Tetsuko Kuroyanagi as older Ikuko
Maiko as Machiko Hatano (her maiden name was Sōma)
Yoko Tsukasa as older Machiko
Kei Tanaka as Haruki Sudō, Yōko's eldest brother
Kento Nagayama Sigeki Sudō, Yōko's eldest brother
Tokio Emoto as Takeo Miyamoto
Ayumi Ito as Natsuko Takahashi
Yumi Shirakawa as Setsuko Miyazawa
Eriko Watanabe as Kayo Murakami
Kazuyoshi Koshida as Michio Maruyama
 Hiroshi Inuzuka as Takeo Miyamoto
Yasufumi Terawaki as Ryūichi Sudō, Yōko's father
Tomoyo Harada as Hiroko Sudō, Yōko's mother
Yuki Saito as Fusako Haraguchi
Kanako Higuchi as Tokoku Maruyama
Misako Watanabe as Fujiko Kirino

International broadcast 
  The broadcast rights for the drama were sold to Sri Lanka with the intention of dubbing it into Sinhalese.

References

External links
 

2011 Japanese television series debuts
2011 Japanese television series endings
Asadora
Television shows written by Yoshikazu Okada